Electrona risso is a species of myctophiform ray-finned fish in the family Myctophidae, the lanternfishes. It is known commonly as the electric lantern fish, chubby flashlight fish, and Risso's lantern-fish. It is a widespread species of all the oceans.

The male reaches a maximum length of about 8.2 centimeters. It becomes sexually mature at about 5.9 centimeters.

This species is epipelagic to mesopelagic, living at depths of 90 to 820 meters, swimming at shallower depths during daylight hours. Its main food items are copepods.

References

Further reading
Goode GB & Bean TH (1896)  "Oceanic Ichthyology, a treatise on the deep-sea and pelagic fishes of the world, based chiefly upon the collections made by the steamers Blake, Albatross, and Fish Hawk in the northwestern Atlantic, with an atlas containing 417 figures". Spec. Bull. U.S. Natl. Mus. Num..Text: XXXV-and 1-26 + 1–553.
Cocco, A., (1829) "Su di alcuni nuovi pesci de' mari di Messina". Giornale di Scienze Lettere e Arti in La Sicilia Anno 7, v. 26 (núm. 77): 138–147. 

Myctophidae
Fish described in 1829
Taxa named by Anastasio Cocco